The Comarnic is a tributary of the river Caraș in Romania. It discharges into the Caraș upstream from Carașova. It flows through the Semenic-Caraș Gorge National Park.

References

Rivers of Romania
Rivers of Caraș-Severin County